Mentor of Rhodes was a Greek mercenary and later Satrap of the Asiatic coast. He fought both for and against Artaxerxes III of Persia. He is also known as the first husband of Barsine, who later became mistress to Alexander the Great.

In 358 BC, Mentor, along with his brother Memnon, were hired to provide military leadership by a rebel Persian satrap, Artabazus. Despite Mentor's capable leadership, the rebellion failed, and Artabazus, Barsine and Memnon fled to Macedon, where they were welcomed by Philip II. Mentor fled to Egypt.

Pharaoh Nectanebo II immediately enlisted the aid of the Greek mercenary, as he expected a Persian invasion was imminent. The pharaoh sent Mentor, at the head of 4000 mercenaries, to support Sidon, which had rebelled from Persia. Although Mentor won significant victories against some of the satraps, he was unable to defeat Artaxerxes' army, and was captured in 346 BC.

Upon his capture, Artaxerxes evidently recognized Mentor's skills, and pardoned him. Immediately, Mentor was sent to aid in the invasion of his former refuge, Egypt. During the Egyptian campaign, Mentor led one of three divisions of the great kings Hellenic army he shared the command with Bagoas, a Persian of some note whom Diodorus of Sicily describes as the man 'whom the King trusted most, a man exceptionally daring and impatient of propriety.' The pair had some success in Egypt taking Bubastus amongst other cities by one cunning device, garrisoning the cities were both native Egyptians and Greek mercenary troops Mentor offered one side or the other a favourable surrender creating stasis and infighting within the garrisons weakening the defensive troops and making it far more easy for the Persians to gain the city by subterfuge. This tactic proved critical in the battle for Egypt, Nectanebo preserving the loss of so many of his fortified towns and cities withdrew from Memphis towards the south, choosing not to contest his kingship in pitched battle.

After the defeat of Egypt, "Artaxerxes, seeing that Mentor the general had performed great services for him in the war against the Egyptians, advanced him over and above his other friends." The king appointed Mentor his commander in the west in 342 BC and satrap of the Asiatic coast; he was also given a vast wealth of silver. One of his actions during his short tenure at this post was to pardon Artabazus, whom he allowed to return home, along with Barsine and Memnon. Mentor died after just four years in his post. His daughter later married Nearchus, and Barsine remarried, to Memnon. Memnon received Mentor's command after his brother's death.

References

Further reading

External links
 Livius.org: Mentor of Rhodes
  Diodorus' account of the Egyptian campaign

Ancient Greek mercenaries in Achaemenid service
Ancient Rhodian generals
Satraps of the Achaemenid Empire
380s BC births
340 BC deaths
4th-century BC Egyptian people
4th-century BC Rhodians
People of the Twenty-ninth Dynasty of Egypt